"Immortal Clay" is the sixteenth episode of the second series of the 1960s cult British spy-fi television series The Avengers, starring Patrick Macnee and Honor Blackman. It was first broadcast in the Teledu Cymru region of the ITV network on Friday 11 January 1963. ABC Weekend TV, who produced the show for ITV, broadcast it the next day in its own regions. The episode was directed by Richmond Harding and written by James Mitchell.

Plot
A company invents an unbreakable ceramic, the secret of which others try to steal. Following the death of an industrial spy in a vat of liquid clay, Steed and Cathy mount an undercover investigation.

Cast
 Patrick Macnee as John Steed
 Honor Blackman as Cathy Gale 
 Paul Eddington as Richard Marling
 James Bree as Miller 
 Bert Palmer as Josh Machen
 Gary Watson  as Allen Marling
 Steve Plytas as De Groot
 Rowena Gregory as Anne
 Didi Sullivan as Mara Little
 Douglas Muir as One Ten
 Frank Olegario as Blomberg

References

External links

Episode overview on The Avengers Forever! website

The Avengers (season 2) episodes
1963 British television episodes